Melanosuchus is a genus of alligatorid caiman. The black caiman of South America is the sole extant (living) species, and is the largest living member of the subfamily caimaninae, and the entire alligator family.

Taxonomy

Extant species
There is one extant species:

Melanosuchus niger (Spix, 1825) - known as the Black caiman, native to the Amazon basin of South America

Fossil species
Fossil species are known from the Late Miocene of South America and include:

Melanosuchus latrubessei Souza-Filho et al, 2020 - discovered in the Solimões Formation of Brazil, dating from the Upper Miocene
Melanosuchus fisheri Medina, 1976 - from the Urumaco Formation of Venezuela, dating from the Late Miocene, but now considered as nomen dubium

Phylogeny
Melanosuchus is a member of the subfamily Caimaninae, which contains the two other extant genera Caiman and Paleosuchus, all of which are native to South and Central America.  The below cladogram shows the relationships of all extant genera within Crocodilia (excluding separate extinct taxa), based on molecular phylogenetic studies.

References

Taxa named by John Edward Gray
Reptile genera
Reptile genera with one living species
Crocodilians of South America
Alligatoridae